Ilaria Alpi (24 May 1961 – 20 March 1994) was an Italian journalist killed in Mogadishu, Somalia, together with her camera operator Miran Hrovatin. In 2009 Francesco Fonti, a former 'Ndrangheta member, claimed that Ilaria Alpi and her cameraman were murdered because they had seen toxic waste shipped by the 'Ndrangheta arrive in Bosaso, Somalia.

At the time of her murder, she was following a case of weapon and illegal toxic waste traffic in which she believed also the Italian Army and other institutions were involved. Alpi was born in Rome and worked for Italian public television broadcaster RAI.

In the 2002 movie Ilaria Alpi - Il più crudele dei giorni, directed by Ferdinando Vincentini Ornagni, she is portrayed by Giovanna Mezzogiorno.

Biography
After graduating at the high school gymnasium "Titus Lucrezio Caro" of Rome, she graduated in literature after completing language courses and Islamic culture in the Department of Oriental Studies of the Sapienza University of Rome.

Thanks to the excellent knowledge of languages (Arabic, French, English) won the first journalist writing from Cairo on behalf of Paese Sera and L'Unità. Later she won a scholarship to be taken to Rai.

She is buried in the Cemetery Flaminio in Rome.

Death
On 20 March 1994, she and Miran Hrovatin were killed in an ambush on their jeep in Mogadishu by a seven-man commando unit after returning from Bosaso, while they were in Mogadishu reporting for Rai 3. 

In 2000, Somali citizen Hashi Omar Hassan was convicted and sentenced to 26 years in prison for the double murder. In October 2016, a court in Perugia, Italy, reversed the conviction and Hassan was awarded more than three million euros for the wrongful conviction and nearly 17 years he had spent in prison.

On 20 March 2014, 20 years after their deaths, the Italian government reportedly authorized the declassification of secret files into their deaths.

In memory of Ilaria Alpi
Since 1995, awards each year in Riccione the Ilaria Alpi Award to the best Italian television investigations devoted to the issues of peace and solidarity.

The 2003 film Ilaria Alpi - Il più crudele dei giorni of Ferdinando Vicentini Orgnani recounts this tragic story.

In 1997, the Gang dedicated the song Chi ha ucciso Ilaria Alpi? (Who killed Ilaria Alpi?), while in 2010 the Pooh wrote the song Reporter, poignant ballad on the album Dove comincia il sole dedicated to Ilaria and her illustrious colleague, Oriana Fallaci.

In 2007 he made his debut at the Prize Ilaria Alpi's monologue civil theater "The Holiday" which reconstructs the case of Ilaria and Miran. Written and performed by Marina Senesi, actress and voice of Radio 2 Caterpillar in collaboration with Sabrina Giannini, journalist of Report. In 2011, at the invitation of Don Luigi Ciotti work was represented on the stage of the "XVI Day of the memory and the commitment against the mafie" and the National Day of Libera.

In May 2009, Daniel Biacchessi writes the story of Ilaria Alpi in his book Passion reporter.

The ONG Emergency has titled the surgical center of Battambang, Cambodia. They were then named several streets, parks, schools, libraries and other public places.

For Ilaria Alpi was named the high school of Rutigliano in the Metropolitan City of Bari.

Plaques and awards

1994, Plate, Community Open, Riccione
1994, Plate, Prize National to Professionalism, Serrone, Fiuggi
1995, Plate, Association of Journalists, Turin
1994, Prize, Clean pens, Sarteano, Siena
2005, Prize, Antonio Russo, Francavilla al mare, Chieti
2003, Prize, Mario de Murtas, Alghero
1995, Prize, the book, International Fair, Messina
Plate, circumscription VIII, Rome
1994, Prize, National Chia for the record photographic and television, Chia, Cagliari
1994, Prize, Prof. G.Moscati, Casanova, Caserta
1995, Prize, Professional Reporter: the image of journalism in film.
1995, Journalist Award Roberto Ghinetti, San Miniato, Pisa
1994, Plate, Memory Serming
1994, Prize journalism, Rotary Club - Carlo Casalegno, Rome
2003, Prize journalism, Andrea Barbato, Mantua
2003, 04, 05, Prize journalism, Chamber of Deputies
Journalist Award, Roma per Roma, Campidoglio
1995, Prize, Antonino Buttitta, Messina
Honorary citizenship and Gold Medal, Sesto San Giovanni, Milan

See also
List of unsolved murders

References

External links
 Death in Somalia by Michael Maren.

1961 births
1990s murders in Somalia
1994 crimes in Somalia
1994 deaths
1994 murders in Africa
20th-century Italian journalists
20th-century Italian women writers
20th-century Italian writers
Assassinated Italian journalists
Female murder victims
Italian people murdered abroad
Journalists killed while covering the Somali Civil War
Unsolved murders in Somalia
Women war correspondents
Writers from Rome
Burials at the Cimitero Flaminio